Karnovsky fixative, developed by M. J. Karnovsky, is a fixative for electron microscopy.

Solution
The stock solution for Karnovsky fixative is as follows:
 2.0 g paraformaldehyde 
 25 ml distilled water
 1M sodium hydroxide 2 - 4 drops
 50% glutaraldehyde 5.0 ml
 0.2M cacodylate buffer, pH 7.4, 20.0 mL

Mix the paraformaldehyde with 25 ml of distilled water in a 125 ml
Erlenmyer flask. Heat to 60°C on a stir plate. When moisture forms on the
sides of flask, add sodium hydroxide and stir until the solution clears. Cool
solution under the faucet. Filter, add glutaraldehyde and 0.2M buffer, pH range
7.2 to 7.4.

Modified solutions
Karnovsky's fixative solution is often modified for specialized applications. For example, 2% paraformaldehyde, 2.5% glutaraldehyde in 0.1 Molar sodium phosphate buffer (pH 7.4) has been used to study the ultrastructure of renal pelvis fragments.

References

External links
 MSDS: Karnovsky's fixative

Electron microscopy